The Șomuzul Mic is a right tributary of the river Siret in Romania. It discharges into the Siret at Rotunda, near Liteni.

References

Rivers of Romania
Rivers of Suceava County